The Folk Show is a radio programme broadcast on Manx Radio and presented by John Kaneen.

The Folk Show features music ranging from early recordings of traditional Folk music through to Contemporary folk music.
Also included on the playlist are recordings by Manx folk bands.

The programme is transmitted on the station's 9:00pm – 10:00pm slot on Tuesday nights and is broadcast on FM and MW frequencies as well as world wide through the Manx Radio website.

Following transmission the edition is then available on the Manx Radio website to be listened to again for the following seven days.

Having presented the show for 45 years, John Kaneen made his final broadcast in June 2022. As a consequence of poor health this transmission was a repeat of a previous edition of the show.

Whilst Manx Radio is a commercial radio station, The Folk Show is not interrupted by the playing of commercials.

References

External links
 Sample from The Folk Show presented by John Kaneen with Peddyr Cubberley, 11 April 2017

Manx Radio programmes
British music radio programmes